The 2020 Billie Jean King Cup Qualifying Round was played on 7–8 February 2020. The eight winners of this round qualified for the 2020 Billie Jean King Cup Finals in Budapest.

Teams
Sixteen teams played for eight spots in the Finals, in series decided on a home and away basis.

These sixteen teams were:
 2 losing semifinalists of the previous edition,
 7 winners & losers of World Group Play-offs of previous edition, and
 4 winners of World Group II Play-offs of previous edition, and
 3 losers of World Group II Play-offs of previous edition, based on rankings 

The 8 losing teams from the qualifying round played at the Group I of the corresponding continental zone the following February.

Seeded teams
 
 
 
 
 
 
 
 

Unseeded teams:

Summary of results

Detailed results

United States vs. Latvia 

Team nominations:
: Sofia Kenin, Serena Williams, Alison Riske, Coco Gauff, Bethanie Mattek-Sands 
: Jeļena Ostapenko, Anastasija Sevastova, Diāna Marcinkēviča, Daniela Vismane

Netherlands vs. Belarus 

Team nominations:
: Kiki Bertens, Arantxa Rus, Lesley Pattinama Kerkhove, Indy de Vroome, Demi Schuurs 
: Aryna Sabalenka, Aliaksandra Sasnovich, Olga Govortsova, Anna Kubareva, Lidziya Marozava

Romania vs. Russia 

Team nominations:
: Ana Bogdan, Irina Bara, Elena-Gabriela Ruse, Jaqueline Cristian, Raluca Olaru 
: Ekaterina Alexandrova, Veronika Kudermetova, Anna Blinkova, Anna Kalinskaya

Brazil vs. Germany 

Team nominations: 
: Gabriela Cé, Teliana Pereira, Laura Pigossi, Carolina Alves, Luisa Stefani
: Laura Siegemund, Tatjana Maria, Anna-Lena Friedsam, Antonia Lottner

Spain vs. Japan 

Team nominations: 
: Carla Suárez Navarro, Sara Sorribes Tormo, Aliona Bolsova, Lara Arruabarrena, Georgina García Pérez 
: Naomi Osaka, Misaki Doi, Kurumi Nara, Ena Shibahara, Shuko Aoyama

Switzerland vs. Canada 

Team nominations: 
: Belinda Bencic, Jil Teichmann, Viktorija Golubic, Stefanie Vögele, Timea Bacsinszky 
: Bianca Andreescu, Leylah Annie Fernandez, Eugenie Bouchard, Gabriela Dabrowski

Belgium vs. Kazakhstan 

Team nominations: 
: Elise Mertens, Kirsten Flipkens, Greet Minnen, Ysaline Bonaventure 
: Yulia Putintseva, Zarina Diyas, Anna Danilina, Yaroslava Shvedova

Slovakia vs. Great Britain 

Team nominations:  
: Viktória Kužmová, Jana Čepelová, Magdaléna Rybáriková, Anna Karolína Schmiedlová, Rebecca Šramková 
: Heather Watson, Harriet Dart, Naiktha Bains, Katie Swan, Emma Raducanu

References

Qualifying
Billie Jean King Cup
Billie Jean King Cup
Billie Jean King Cup